is a chain of hotels headquartered in Kita-ku, Osaka, Japan. It is a subsidiary of Hankyu Hanshin Holdings. As of 2019, it has 46 properties (opened or announced) in Japan, 19 directly operated and 27 under franchise management.

History
The origins of the business can be traced back to 1926, when Ichizō Kobayashi, the founder of Hankyu Railway acquired the Takarazuka Hotel in Takarazuka.

On August 8, 1964, the New Hankyu Hotel opened in Umeda, Osaka, incorporated with Hankyu Umeda Station.

On May 26, 2000, Daiichi Hotel Ltd. went bankrupt after applying for the Corporate Rehabilitation Law.

On November 1, 2001, Hankyu Corporation invested 1 billion yen to purchase the Daiichi Hotels Group. Following its acquisition in 2002, it became a subsidiary of Hankyu Hotels.

On April 1, 2005, Hankyu-Daiichi Hotels Company Ltd. and Hotel New Hankyu Group was merged to become Hankyu-Daiichi Hotels Group.

On October 1, 2006, Hankyu Holdings became the wholly owning parent company of Hanshin Electric Railway Co., Ltd. and the holdings were renamed Hankyu Hanshin Holdings, Inc. Hankyu-Daiichi Hotels also changed the legal name to Hankyu Hanshin-Daiichi Hotels Co., Ltd. on the same day.

Group hotels

Japan

Hankyu Hotels
Kantō
Tokyo
 Ginza Creston Hotel (Chūō)
Kansai
 Hyōgo Prefecture
 Takarazuka Hotel (Takarazuka)
 Kyoto Prefecture
 Hotel New Hankyu Kyoto (Kyoto)
 Osaka Prefecture
 Hotel Hankyu International (Osaka)
 Hotel New Hankyu Osaka (Osaka)
 Hotel New Hankyu Annex (Osaka)
 Senri Hankyu Hotel (Toyonaka)
 Hotel Hankyu Expo Park (Suita)
Shikoku
 Kōchi Prefecture
 The Crown Palais New Hankyu Kochi (Kōchi)

Hanshin Hotels
Kansai
 Osaka Prefecture
 Hotel Hanshin Osaka (Osaka)
 Hotel Hanshin Annex Osaka (Osaka)

Remm
Remm is the brand name for city hotels.
Kantō
Tokyo
 Remm Hibiya (Chiyoda)
 Remm Akihabara (Chiyoda)
 Remm Roppongi (Minato)
 Remm Tokyo Kyobashi (Chūō)
Kansai
 Osaka Prefecture
 Remm Shin-Osaka (Osaka)
Kyūshū
 Kagoshima Prefecture
 Remm Kagoshima (Kagoshima)

Daiichi Hotels
Tōhoku
 Yamagata Prefecture
 Tokyo Daiichi Hotel Tsuruoka (Tsuruoka)
 Tokyo Daiichi Hotel Yonezawa (Yonezawa)
Kantō
 Kanagawa Prefecture
 Daiichi Inn Shonan (Fujisawa)
Tokyo
 Daiichi Hotel Tokyo (Minato)
 Daiichi Hotel Annex (Chiyoda)
 Daiichi Hotel Tokyo Seafort (Shinagawa)
 Daiichi Hotel Ryogoku (Sumida) 
 Daiichi Inn Ikebukuro (Toshima)
 Kichijōji Daiichi Hotel (Musashino)  
Chūbu
Aichi Prefecture
 Tokyo Daiichi Hotel Nishiki (Nagoya)
Toyama Prefecture
 Toyama Daiichi Hotel (Toyama)
 Daiichi Inn Shinminato (Imizu)
Kansai
 Osaka Prefecture
 Osaka Daiichi Hotel (Osaka)
 Shiga Prefecture
 Hotel Boston Plaza Kusatsu (Kusatsu)
Chūgoku
 Yamaguchi Prefecture
 Tokyo Daiichi Hotel Shimonoseki (Shimonoseki)
Shikoku
 Ehime Prefecture
 Tokyo Daiichi Hotel Matsuyama (Matsuyama)
 Imabari International Hotel (Imabari)
 Kagawa Prefecture
 Takamatsu International Hotel (Takamatsu)

Others
Tokyo Daiichi Hotel Iwanuma Resort (Iwanuma)
Tokyo Daiichi Hotel Shin-Shirakawa (Shirakawa) 
Hotel Ours Inn Hankyu (Shinagawa)
Umeda OS Hotel (Osaka)
Arima Kirari (Kobe)
Amanohashidate Hotel (Miyazu)
Hotel Royal Hill Fukuchiyama & Spa (Fukuchiyama)
Hotel Bay Gulls (Tajiri, Sennan District, Osaka)
Hotel Ichibata: (Matsue)
Kure Hankyu Hotel: (Kure)
JR Hotel Clement Takamatsu: (Takamatsu) 
JR Hotel Clement Tokushima: (Tokushima)

Gallery

See also 
 Hankyu Hanshin Holdings

References

External links

 

Companies based in Osaka Prefecture
Hospitality companies of Japan
Hotel chains in Japan
Hankyu Hanshin Holdings
Japanese brands